Meadow Brook Township is a township in Cass County, Minnesota, United States. The population was 183 as of the 2000 census. Meadow Brook Township took its name from a stream where a schoolhouse once stood.

Geography
According to the United States Census Bureau, the township has a total area of 38.9 square miles (100.8 km2), of which 38.6 square miles (99.9 km2) is land and 0.3 square miles (0.9 km2) (0.90%) is water.

Unincorporated communities
 Leader

Major highway
  Minnesota State Highway 64

Lakes
 Ackerson Lake
 Clear Lake
 Crooked Lake
 Hogans Lake
 Meadow Lake
 Mud Lake
 Pale Lake
 Round Lake
 Section Thirtysix Lake (southwest half)

Adjacent townships
 Moose Lake Township (north)
 Maple Township (northeast)
 Home Brook Township (east)
 Fairview Township (southeast)
 May Township (south)
 Becker Township (southwest)
 Byron Township (west)
 Poplar Township (northwest)

Demographics
As of the census of 2000, there were 183 people, 80 households, and 51 families residing in the township.  The population density was 4.7 people per square mile (1.8/km2).  There were 230 housing units at an average density of 6.0/sq mi (2.3/km2).  The racial makeup of the township was 96.72% White, 1.64% Native American, 0.55% Asian, and 1.09% from two or more races.

There were 80 households, out of which 17.5% had children under the age of 18 living with them, 52.5% were married couples living together, 3.8% had a female householder with no husband present, and 36.3% were non-families. 27.5% of all households were made up of individuals, and 8.8% had someone living alone who was 65 years of age or older.  The average household size was 2.29 and the average family size was 2.73.

In the township the population was spread out, with 20.8% under the age of 18, 6.6% from 18 to 24, 23.5% from 25 to 44, 34.4% from 45 to 64, and 14.8% who were 65 years of age or older.  The median age was 45 years. For every 100 females, there were 117.9 males.  For every 100 females age 18 and over, there were 119.7 males.

The median income for a household in the township was $35,278, and the median income for a family was $36,944. Males had a median income of $37,750 versus $15,625 for females. The per capita income for the township was $14,869.  About 19.0% of families and 22.2% of the population were below the poverty line, including 41.3% of those under the age of eighteen and 7.4% of those 65 or over.

References
 United States National Atlas
 United States Census Bureau 2007 TIGER/Line Shapefiles
 United States Board on Geographic Names (GNIS)

Townships in Cass County, Minnesota
Brainerd, Minnesota micropolitan area
Townships in Minnesota